Z. Obed (died 30 January 2020) was a politician from Nagaland, India. In 2003, he was elected to the Legislative Assembly of Nagaland, as the Nagaland People's Front candidate in the constituency Kohima Town (ST). In 1993, he was elected as an Indian National Congress candidate. In 1998, he again contested as INC candidate, but lost.

In 2007, he led a rebellion inside the ruling coalition, seeking to remove Neiphiu Rio as Chief Minister. In September 2007, he resigned from NPF, after being suspended for two years from the party.

References

2020 deaths
Nagaland MLAs 1993–1998
Naga People's Front politicians
Indian National Congress politicians from Nagaland
Nagaland MLAs 2003–2008
Year of birth missing